The Rzeszowski family homicides occurred on 14 August 2011 in Saint Helier, Jersey in the Channel Islands. Damian Rzeszowski stabbed to death six people including four members of his family. He was found guilty of manslaughter with diminished responsibility and sentenced to 30 years in prison for each victim. He died in a suspected suicide in HMP Full Sutton on 31 March 2018.

Background 
Damian Rzeszowski was born in Nowy Sącz, Poland in 1980. He met Izabela Garstka and in 2004 they moved to Jersey to live with her father, Marek Garstka. They married in 2005 and had two children, Kinga, and Kacper.

In June 2011, Izabela confessed to Damian that she had been having a two month affair with another man. In turn, Damian had a one-night stand of his own and made Izabela aware of this.

On 19 July 2011, Damian took an overdose of anti-depressant pills and was allowed to go back home after just one night in hospital. According to Damian's family a friend's failed property deal in his home country also contributed to his mental state at the time. He was deceived by a property developer, to whom he already paid 50,000 PLN (around 10,000 GBP). He was supposed to pay it back in instalments of 1,000 PLN a month. Damian's father, who lives in Nowy Sącz, had power of attorney in this matter. The young family spent their final two or three weeks on a reconciliation holiday in Poland. During that time Damian had sex with a prostitute.

Damian Rzeszowski had a history of violence, alcohol abuse and had been involved in several fights since moving to Jersey.

Murders 
The Rzeszowski family had returned from Poland on the day of killings. They invited their neighbour Marta, Izabela's best friend, for a barbeque. She came along with her five year old daughter, Julia. Around 3pm, Damian armed himself with two kitchen knives before he started the killings.

His 56-year-old father-in-law Marek Garstka was lying on a couch when he was attacked; Damian, using both knives, brutally stabbed him nine times. Damian then moved to the living room where he stabbed his son Kacper 16 times and both girls 13 times each. Izabela escaped after being attacked in the flat and was pursued down the street in full view of neighbours. She carried a mobile phone with her and tried to contact emergency services, but dialled 997 (emergency number in Poland) instead of 999.  She was stabbed to death on the street as neighbours tried to tackle the killer using traffic cones. Marta's body was later found on a neighbour's doorstep where she cried for help before dying.

After murdering his wife, Damian returned home while stabbing himself repeatedly in the chest. He fell to the ground with a collapsed lung.

The attack lasted 15 minutes.  Police officers arrived around five minutes after the attack.

Aftermath 
Rzeszowski was arrested in hospital after doctors carried out life-saving emergency surgery and held at Broadmoor Hospital in Berkshire. Consultant psychiatrist Dale Harrison interviewed Rzeszowski five days after the attacks and heard he could not remember what had happened. After returning from treatment in Broadmoor, he claimed he could hear voices. He denied six murders, however pleaded guilty to manslaughter due to diminished responsibility.

On 29 October 2012, Damian Rzeszowski was sentenced to life in prison, 30 years for each victim to run concurrently.

On 31 March 2018, six years into his sentence, the killer died in a suspected suicide in Full Sutton prison, a high-security jail in Yorkshire. A post-mortem examination determined that his cause of death was hanging.

In popular culture 
In 2019, two Polish journalists, Ewa Winnicka and Dionisios Sturis wrote a book about the murders, Voices. What Happened on the Island of Jersey. The book was written with co-operation from the Garstka family, neighbours, friends and investigators, and was based partly on court evidence and police documents.

References 

August 2011 crimes
Crime in Jersey
Familicides
Knife attacks
Mass murder in 2011
Mass murder in the United Kingdom
Mass stabbings in the United Kingdom
Stabbing attacks in 2011
Stabbing attacks in the United Kingdom